The 2018 season is the 121st season of competitive football in Sweden. Sweden participated in the 2018 FIFA World Cup after finishing 2nd in qualifying, and beating Italy in the play-offs. The team reached the quarter-finals, where they were knocked-out by England by the score of 0–2.

Domestic results

Men's football

Allsvenskan

Playoffs

2–2 on aggregate. AFC Eskilstuna won on away goals.

Superettan

Playoffs

Syrianska FC won 3–2 on aggregate.

4–4 on aggregate. Varbergs BoIS won on away goals.

National teams

Sweden men's national football team

2018 FIFA World Cup

Group stage

Knock-out stage

2018–19 UEFA Nations League

Group B2

Friendlies

Total results summary

Sweden national under-21 football team

2019 UEFA Euro Under-21 Championship qualification

Total results summary

Sweden national under-19 football team

2018 UEFA European Under-19 Championship qualification

2019 UEFA European Under-19 Championship qualification

Total results summary

Sweden national under-17 football team

2018 UEFA European Under-17 Championship qualification

2018 UEFA European Under-17 Championship

Group stage

Knock-out stage

Total results summary

Sweden women's national football team

2019 FIFA Women's World Cup qualification

2018 Algarve Cup

Group stage

Final

 The final game was called off due to heavy rain and adverse weather conditions, and both teams were awarded first place.

Friendlies

Total results summary

References

 
Seasons in Swedish football